Komamura may refer to:

, Japanese cross-country skier
 Sajin Komamura, a soul reaper in the Bleach series
 Komamura Corporation, a company producing cameras

Japanese-language surnames